Hypoclinemus mentalis is a species of freshwater American sole native to the Amazon, Orinoco and Essequibo river basins in tropical South America. This species is the only known member of its genus.

References
 

Achiridae
Taxa named by Paul Chabanaud
Monotypic fish genera